Dariam Acevedo Santiago (born December 15, 1984 in Trujillo Alto) is a female beach volleyball player from Puerto Rico who won the gold medal at the NORCECA Circuit 2009 at Montelimar, Nicaragua playing with Yarleen Santiago.

She majored in kinesiology at University of Texas at Austin and played as outside hitter. There she earned two times All Conference All Academic First team between 2004 and 2005 and All Conference All Academic Second Team in 2006. She also won All Conference Honorable Mention in 2004, same year she won Conference newcomer of the Year. In 2005, she won CoSIDA Academic All-District All Academic.

Indoor
Dariam also plays indoor volleyball with the national team and currently professionally with Mets de Guaynabo from Liga de Voleibol Superior Femenino.
She participated at the 2002 FIVB Volleyball Women's World Championship in Germany.

Clubs
 Chicas de San Juan (1996–1999)
 Criollas de Caguas (2007–2008)
 Mets de Guaynabo (2009)
 Criollas de Caguas (2015)

Awards

College
 2004 All Conference Honorable Mention
 2004 Conference Newcomer of the Year
 2004-2005 All Conference "All Academic First Team"
 2005 CoSIDA Academic All-District
 2006 All Conference "All Academic Second Team"

National Team
 NORCECA Beach Volleyball Circuit Nicaragua 2009  Gold Medal
 NORCECA Beach Volleyball Circuit Jamaica 2009  Silver Medal

References

External links
 
 

Living people
1984 births
People from Trujillo Alto, Puerto Rico
Puerto Rican women's beach volleyball players
Puerto Rican women's volleyball players
University of Texas at Austin College of Education alumni
Volleyball players at the 2007 Pan American Games
Wing spikers
Pan American Games competitors for Puerto Rico
Texas Longhorns women's volleyball players